Okatana may refer to:

Okatana, Namibia, a settlement and former Catholic mission station in northern Namibia
Okatana Constituency, an electoral constituency in northern Namibia
Okatana River, a river in northern Namibia
Ōkatana, a slightly longer katana (Japanese sword)
oKatanas, a Roblox player and YouTuber known in the Assassin! community